Kévin Jacmot (born 22 March 1984) is a French former professional footballer who played as a midfielder.

Career
Born in Lyon, France, Jacmot started his career at Lyon in 2002, and was sent away on loan to Bastia the following season. He then moved to Championnat de France Amateur club Lyon Duchère. In March 2006 his club was unable to reach him and it was reported that he would retire.

However, after a season at Lyon Duchère, he moved to Saint-Priest.

Jacmot played for Championnat National side Gap in the 2010–11 season.

Jacmot was a member of the France U-17 national team and played for them at the 2001 FIFA U-17 World Championship which the team won.

References

External links
 
 
 
 

1984 births
Living people
French footballers
Association football midfielders
France youth international footballers
Ligue 1 players
Challenger Pro League players
Championnat National players
Championnat National 2 players
Olympique Lyonnais players
SC Bastia players
Lyon La Duchère players
AS Saint-Priest players
R.E. Virton players
Gap HAFC players
Footballers from Lyon